Walpole most commonly refers to the first Prime Minister of Great Britain Robert Walpole and his governments, the Walpole–Townshend ministry and the Walpole ministry.

Walpole may also refer to:

People 
 Walpole (surname)
 Baron Walpole, a title in the Peerage of Great Britain
 Walpole G. Colerick (1845–1911), American politician
 Walpole Vidal (1853–1914), 19th century British footballer

Places

Australia 
 Walpole, Western Australia
 Walpole River, Western Australia

Canada 
 Rural Municipality of Walpole No. 92, Saskatchewan
 Walpole Island First Nation, Ontario

England 
 Walpole, Norfolk, a parish that includes the villages of Walpole St Andrew and Walpole St Peter
 Walpole, Suffolk
 Walpole Cross Keys, Norfolk
 Walpole Highway, Norfolk
 Walpole Park, London Borough of Ealing

France 
 Walpole Island (New Caledonia)

United States 
 Walpole, Maine
 Walpole, Massachusetts, a New England town
 Walpole (CDP), Massachusetts, the original village within the town
 Massachusetts Correctional Institution – Cedar Junction, formerly known as Walpole
 Walpole, New Hampshire, a New England town
 Walpole (CDP), New Hampshire, the central village in the town

Transportation 
 HMS Walpole (D41), a 1918 W-class destroyer of the Royal Navy
 Walpole (1779 EIC ship), an East Indiaman
 Walpole (1798 EIC ship), an East Indiaman
 Walpole railway station (England), a former station in Walpole, Norfolk, England
 Walpole station (MBTA), or Union Station, in Walpole, Massachusetts, United States

Other uses 
 Turbonilla walpole, a sea snail of family Pyramidellidae
 Walpole (trade association)

See also